Viktor Nikolayevich Melnikov (Russian name: Виктор Николаевич Мельников; born 10 July 1944) is a Soviet rower from Russia. He competed at the 1968 Summer Olympics in Mexico City in the men's single sculls event where he qualified for the small final but did not start.

References

1944 births
Living people
Soviet male rowers
Olympic rowers of the Soviet Union
Rowers at the 1968 Summer Olympics
Rowers from Moscow